"Top Gear: Middle East Special" (or "Top Gear: Nativity Special") is a 76-minute-long extended episode of Top Gear series 16.  The film predates the Syrian Civil War and involves a  road-trip from Erbil International Airport in Iraqi Kurdistan to Bethlehem, nominally recreating the journey of the Three Wise Men.  Their journey takes them across the Middle East via southern Turkey, the cities of Aleppo, Palmyra and Damascus in Syria, then Jerash in Jordan and finally the Mount of Olives.  The journey includes visiting an abandoned theme park, and a stop at Ein Gev on the Sea of Galilee.

Planning and filming
Planning for the episode began in January 2010, with the concept of the Baby Stig added later as a plot device to introduce a new Stig following the departure of Ben Collins.  The Top Gear convoy included support vehicles for camera crews and the production team, plus a medic and a private security team.  Filming took place during October 2010, with the convoy negotiating the Sheikh Hussein Bridge border crossing from Jordan to Israel on 19 October 2010.  Subsequent filming took place in Nazareth with the crew departing via Highway 6.  The Kurdistan UK Friendship Association, RUS Aviation (suppliers of the Ilyushin Il-76 cargo plane), and the Syrian Automobile club are thanked in the credits.

Because it was a BBC production the Top Gear film crew were prevented from crossing the Iran–Iraq border.  During filming in Syria, presenter James May suffered a concussion having been knocked over by a tow rope, and was collected from hospital by Jeremy Clarkson and Richard Hammond who were wearing burqas as a disguise.  The film crew encountered food poisoning, landmines, and border controls.  May was greeted by locals using his name in Iraq and Syria.  Whilst crossing Syria the presenters discovered they were extremely popular and well known.

The cars purchased with a budget of £3,500 each have number plates from the country of Georgia.  Clarkson is driving a Mazda MX-5, Hammond a Fiat Barchetta Riviera and May a BMW Z3.  The team arrives sitting in their vehicles inside a Russian Cargo aeroplane which opens the cargo door prior to landing and performs a go-around, before the starting location is revealed as Iraq.

Experiments were made on bulletproofing the car doors. During the trip the cars were decorated in a Bedouin-style, with survival equipment, and one car with bull bars and a large hookah.  Hammond's car was fitted with a car stereo that played songs by Genesis non-stop, and was transformed to give the appearance of a nomadic tent. May's BMW was camouflaged using inspiration from the Afrika Corps, and Clarkson's Mazda received a Technicolour Dreamcoat-style paint scheme.  During a NASCAR-style rally race at a Roman circus, the Gladiator soundtrack is played along with music from Ben-Hur.  Clarkson narrates the words "Peace on Earth, and Goodwill to all men" from the Annunciation to the shepherds as the team are seen passing the Israeli West Bank barrier.  The episode ends with the presenters finding a miniature version of The Stig, complete with racing overalls and helmet.  The presenters' gifts are a gold-relief medallion, a shampoo bottle called "Frankincense" and a Nintendo DSi XL in lieu of myrrh.

Broadcast
Along with the Top Gear: East Coast Road Trip it was one of two specials produced in 2010.  It was broadcast in the United Kingdom on 26 December 2010 and watched by 5.863 million viewers on BBC Two plus 546,000 viewers on BBC HD.  The following-day repeat had a 7-day total of 2.988 million viewers on BBC Two, plus 202,000 on BBC HD.  By the end of December 2010, it had been viewed 1.26 million times on the BBC iPlayer.  It was scheduled for broadcast in Australia on 8 February 2011 on Channel Nine, and watched by 792,000 viewers.  The adventure was included in the "Top Gear – The Great Adventures 1–4" DVD box set released in 2016.

After the screening of the episode the three main cars joined the World of Top Gear exhibition in the collection of the National Motor Museum, Beaulieu in England.  The cars were exhibited again at the ExCeL London conference centre for Top Gear Live in November 2011.  Unpainted HO scale and TT scale models were made available for 3D printing.

Reception
At the time, The Daily Telegraph described it as "one of the best [Top Gear] specials yet." In 2015 the Swiss magazine Watson (de) included the Middle East Special on their top-eighteen best Top Gear moments describing it as the best Christmas Special of all time.  In 2021, Clarkson described the Middle East Special as the best of the adventures to watch.

For the Middle East Special the BBC Trust's Editorial Standards Committee reviewed two rejected appeals in June 2011, two in July 2011 and one in October 2011, noting in all instances that they were "satisfied that the decision not to proceed with the appeal was correct."

References

External links
 
 Top Gear: Middle East Special Gallery on Flickr 

Top Gear special episodes
2010 in British television
2010 television specials